RPM was a Canadian magazine that published the best-performing singles of Canada from 1964 to 2000. During 1987, thirty-one different songs reached number one. Bruce Hornsby and the Range achieved the first number-one single of the year, "The Way It Is", while George Michael became the final musician to peak at the top spot during the year with "Faith". Of the thirty-one musical acts that earned a number-one single, twenty-two of them reached number one for the first time; those who had previously topped the listing were Corey Hart, Starship, Madonna, Whitney Houston, Atlantic Starr, Bob Seger, Billy Idol, Jennifer Warnes, and George Michael. The only Canadian who reached the summit this year was Corey Hart.

The longest-running chart-topper and most successful track of the year was Los Lobos's cover of "La Bamba", which spent seven weeks at number one from 5 September to 17 October. Madonna was the only artist to peak at number one with multiple singles: "La Isla Bonita" and "Who's That Girl", which remained at the top for a week each. Billy Idol obtained the second-most weeks at number one in 1987—four—with his live rendition of "Mony Mony" while Club Nouveau and Cutting Crew each spent three issues at the top with "Lean on Me" and "(I Just) Died in Your Arms", respectively.

Chart history

Notes

See also
1987 in music

List of Billboard Hot 100 number ones of 1987

References

External links
 Read about RPM Magazine at the AV Trust
 Search RPM charts here at Library and Archives Canada

 
1987 record charts
1987